¿Quién quiere ser millonario? (English translation: Who Wants to Be a Millionaire?) is a Costa Rican game show based on the original British format of Who Wants to Be a Millionaire?. The show is hosted by Ignacio Santos Pasamontes. The main goal of the game is to win 30,000,000 Costa Rican colón by answering 15 multiple-choice questions correctly. There are four lifelines - Fifty-Fifty, Video Call, Plus One and Switch the Question. ¿Quién quiere ser millonario? was originally broadcast from February 3, 2009 to September 3, 2013. A revival premiered on April 27, 2021. It is shown on the private TV station Teletica. When a contestant gets the fifth question correct, he/she leaves with at least ₡500,000. When a contestant gets the tenth question correct, he/she leaves with at least ₡3,000,000. Two contestants won the top prize.

Money tree

Winners

Willy Pérez - June 29, 2010

Inés Trejos - September 29, 2021

References

Who Wants to Be a Millionaire?
2000s Costa Rican television series
2009 Costa Rican television series debuts
2013 Costa Rican television series endings
Teletica original programming